"My Country, 'Tis of Thee", also known as simply "America", is an American patriotic song, the lyrics of which were written by Samuel Francis Smith. The song served as one of the de facto national anthems of the United States (along with songs like "Hail, Columbia") before the adoption of "The Star-Spangled Banner" as the official U.S. national anthem in 1931. The melody used is the same as that of the national anthem of the United Kingdom, "God Save the King".

History
Samuel Francis Smith wrote the lyrics to "America" in 1831 while a student at the Andover Theological Seminary in Andover, Massachusetts. The use of the same melody as the British royal anthem can be described as a contrafactum which reworks this symbol of British monarchy to make a statement about American democracy.

Well-known composer Lowell Mason had requested that Smith translate or provide new lyrics for a collection of German songs, among them one written to this melody. Smith gave Mason the lyrics he had written, and the song was first performed in public on July 4, 1831, at a children's Independence Day celebration at Park Street Church in Boston. The first publication of "America" was in 1832.

Lyrics
An abolitionist version was written, by A.G. Duncan, 1843, with lyrics mentioning white and black races. For Washington's Centennial celebration, another verse was added to the original version.

Notable performances

Marian Anderson performed the song at the Lincoln Memorial on Easter Sunday, April 9, 1939. Anderson, an African American singer, had been forbidden to perform at the DAR Constitution Hall due to its racist whites-only policy. After a national outcry, and with support from Eleanor Roosevelt, the concert was held on the steps of the memorial, and attracted a crowd of more than 75,000 in addition to a national radio audience of millions.

Martin Luther King Jr. recited the first verse of the song toward the end of his famous "I Have a Dream" speech at the Lincoln Memorial during the March on Washington for Jobs and Freedom on August 28, 1963.

Crosby, Stills & Nash performed the song on the first episode of The Tonight Show with Jay Leno that aired after the September 11 attacks in 2001.

On January 20, 2009, Aretha Franklin sang the song at the first inauguration of Barack Obama. At his second inauguration, Kelly Clarkson sang it.

See also

Other texts set to the same music:
"Heil dir im Siegerkranz"
"Kongesangen"
"Oben am jungen Rhein"
"The Prayer of Russians"
"Rufst du, mein Vaterland"

Organ variations by Charles Ives:
Variations on "America"

References

Bibliography

External links

 Page about the song at the Library of Congress, with scans, etc.
 Public Domain version of the sheet music in multiple formats for viewing, printing, editing, etc. – (from the Choral Public Domain Library)
 Review of a book about the song from the Journal of American History
 CyberHymnal – contains history, lyrics, and infinitely-looping MIDI music.
 

1831 songs
American patriotic songs
Historical national anthems
North American anthems
National anthem compositions in G major
God Save the King